Jahanara Hai is a Pakistani actress. She is known for her roles in dramas Mere Humdam, Aatish, Ek Hi Bhool and Mehndi.

Early life
Jahanara was born in 1939 on 23rd December in Karachi, Pakistan. She completed her studies from University of Karachi.

Career
She started her acting career in 1960s. She appeared in dramas on PTV. She is known for her roles in dramas Zard Mausam, Rishtay Kuch Adhooray Se, Mehndi, Aik Thi Misaal, Dil-e-Beqarar, Maikay Ki Yaad Na Aaye and Khalish, Mere Humdam. She also appeared in film Lala Begum.

Personal life
Jahanara is married to Farooq and has a son.

Filmography

Television

Telefilm

Film

References

External links
 

1939 births
Living people
20th-century Pakistani actresses
Pakistani television actresses
21st-century Pakistani actresses
Pakistani film actresses